George Pim (14 January 1899 – 19 July 1976) was a British bobsledder. He competed in the four-man events at the 1924 Winter Olympics and the 1928 Winter Olympics.

References

1899 births
1976 deaths
British male bobsledders
Olympic bobsledders of Great Britain
Bobsledders at the 1924 Winter Olympics
Bobsledders at the 1928 Winter Olympics
Sportspeople from Dublin (city)